A rainbow party is a supposed group sex event featured in an urban legend spread since the early 2000s. A variant of other sex party urban myths, the stories claim that at these events, allegedly increasingly popular among adolescents, girls wearing various shades of lipstick take turns fellating boys in sequence, leaving multiple colors (resembling a rainbow) on their penises. 

The idea was publicized on The Oprah Winfrey Show in 2003, and became the subject of a 2005 juvenile novel called Rainbow Party. Sex researchers and adolescent health care professionals have found no evidence for the existence of rainbow parties, and consequently attribute the spread of the stories to a moral panic.

Origin
The story was originally related by American Christian pediatrician Meg Meeker in her 2002 book Epidemic: How Teen Sex Is Killing Our Kids.  The book related allegations of adolescents suffering cancer, sterility, acute infections, and unwanted pregnancies as a consequence of starting sexual activity too early in life.  Meeker relates the following story from a 14-year-old patient from Michigan:
[Allyson] had heard some kids were going to have a "rainbow party," but had no idea what that meant.  Still, she thought it might be fun, and arranged to attend with a friend.  After she arrived, several girls (all in the eighth grade) were given different shades of lipstick and told to perform oral sex on different boys to give them "rainbows."  Once she realized what was happening, Allyson was too stunned and frightened to do anything.  When a girl gave her some lipstick, she refused at first but, with repeated pressure, finally gave in. "It was one of the grossest things I've ever done."

Evidence of falsity
Deborah Tolman, director of the Center for Research on Gender and Sexuality at San Francisco State University, wrote:  "This 'phenomenon' has all the classic hallmarks of a moral panic. One day we have never heard of rainbow parties and then suddenly they are everywhere, feeding on adults' fears that morally-bankrupt sexuality among teens is rampant, despite any actual evidence, as well as evidence to the contrary."

Tolman found that several features of the story ring false. She was skeptical that many adolescent girls would be motivated to engage in such activity in the face of the severe social stigma still attached to sexual activity, and rejected the idea that adolescent boys would examine each other's lipstick marks.

Reason writer Nick Gillespie has claimed "Rainbow parties are as real as unicorns."

In the media 

 The idea of the rainbow party was publicized in October 2003 on the episode of The Oprah Winfrey Show titled "Is Your Child Leading a Double Life?", which was about the trend of increasing sexual promiscuity among American youth and the lack of parental awareness of the sexual practices of their children. In O Magazine, Michelle Burford asserted, among other things, that many teens across the United States engaged in rainbow parties.

 Rainbow Party is a 2005 novel by Paul Ruditis commissioned by a Simon & Schuster editor. The book, which Library Journal declined to review, is about teens who fantasize about having a rainbow party. The book has proven controversial, as it was meant for teenagers (recommended by the publisher for ages 14 and up), thus raising questions about its propriety. In turn, concerns were raised that excluding the book from bookstores and libraries would amount to censorship. The publishers justified Rainbow Party on the grounds that it was a cautionary tale intended to teach readers that oral sex can be dangerous.
 On May 27, 2010, the television program The Doctors discussed the topic with dozens of teens, parents, and professionals.

 Rainbow Party (2015) is a 15-minute Icelandic film that tells the story of 14-year-old Sofia, who is being bullied by a popular girl clique at school. One day Sofia decides to fight back and the girls see her in a new light. She is invited to join the girls as they attend a party. Nervous, Sofia decides to take her best friend Einar with her to the party which is being hosted by the most popular girl of all. At the party, the girls challenge Sofia to join them in completing the rainbow challenge – where each girl puts on a different shade of lipstick, and all girls then place their lips once on a boy, leaving him with a rainbow pattern on his penis. Two eighth grade boys are in a room, passed out from being given too much alcohol. She is to add her color and take a selfie of it as proof to the other girls. She is stunned to discover one of the boys is Einar. Imdb.com lists the Icelandic writer/director/producer as Eva Sigurdardottir. The film is occasionally seen in the U.S. on ShortsTV.
 The podcast You're Wrong About explores the cultural phenomenon of rainbow parties in its 2019 episode "Poisoned Halloween Candy and Other Urban Legends".

References

Group sex
Oral eroticism
Sexual urban legends